Børre is a Norwegian given name, and may refer to:

Børre Dalhaug (born 1974), Norwegian musician and arranger
Børre Falkum-Hansen (1919–2006), Norwegian sailor and Olympic medalist
Egil Børre Johnsen (born 1936), Norwegian writer
Børre Knudsen (born 1937), Norwegian Lutheran minister
Fred Børre Lundberg (born 1969), former Nordic combined skier from Norway
Børre Næss (born 1982), Norwegian cross-country skier who has competed since 2002
Børre Rognlien (born 1944), Norwegian sports official and politician
Børre Rønningen (born 1949), Norwegian politician
Børre Sæthre (born 1967), Norwegian artist
Odd Børre Sørensen (1939-2023), Norwegian pop singer
Børre Steenslid (born 1985), Norwegian professional footballer

See also
 Borre (disambiguation)

Norwegian masculine given names
Norwegian-language surnames